The Vineyard is a Grade II listed house at 79 Hurlingham Road, Fulham, London.

It was built in the early 17th century, and has 18th century alterations, and probably the largest private garden in the London Borough of Hammersmith and Fulham.

In 1918, The Vineyard was purchased by the press baron Max Aitken, Lord Beaverbrook, and he lived there from 1921 to 1947.  Winston Churchill was a frequent visitor.  The house remained in the ownership of the Beaverbrook family until the 1990s.

References

Grade II listed houses in London
Houses in the London Borough of Hammersmith and Fulham
Houses completed in the 17th century
Grade II listed buildings in the London Borough of Hammersmith and Fulham